Andhra Pradesh Grameena Vikas Bank is an Indian Regional Rural Bank headquartered in Warangal, India. It was established in 2006 as a Regional Rural Bank as per Regional Rural Banks Act of 1976. By amalgamation, on 31 March 2006, of the following 5 banks, sponsored by SBI, to participate more energetically, with synergy, in the upliftment and development of Rural Farm Sector and Rural Non-Farm Sector, with emphasis on the deprived, the Rural Poor, Rural ISB and Rural Crafts. It is under the ownership of Ministry of Finance , Government of India.

Amalgamated Five Regional Rural Banks

 Sri Visakha Grameena Bank (Established on 30-09-1976)
 Nagarjuna Grameena Bank (Established on 30-04-1976)
 Sangameswara Grameena Bank (Established on 31-03-1982)
 Manjira Grameena Bank (Established on 31-03-1982)
 Kakathiya Grameena Bank (Established on 28-06-1982)

Districts Covered

IN TELANGANA STATE
 Bhadradri Kothagudem
 Bhongir
 Bhupalapalli(Jaishanker)
 Gadwal Jogulamaba
 Jangaon
 Khammam
 Mahabubabad
 Mahabubnagar
 Medak
 Nagarkurnool
 Nalgonda
 Rangareddy
 Sangareddy
 Siddipet
 Suryapet
 Vikarabad
 Wanaparthy
 Warangal Rural
 Warangal Urban
 Yadadri Bhuvanagiri

IN ANDHRA PRADESH STATE
 Alluri Sitharama Raju
 Anakapalle
 Parvathipuram Manyam
 Srikakulam
 Visakhapatnam
 Vizianagaram

Ownership

Government of India :50%
Government of Andhra Pradesh :15%
State Bank of India :35%

Andhra Pradesh Grameena Vikas Bank has its branches in Andhra Pradesh and Telangana

See also

 Banking in India
 List of banks in India
 Reserve Bank of India
 Regional Rural Bank
 Indian Financial System Code
 List of largest banks
 List of companies of India
 Make in India

References
 http://www.apgvbank.in/

Banks established in 2006
Regional rural banks of India
Companies based in Andhra Pradesh
Economy of Telangana
2006 establishments in Andhra Pradesh